

Events 
 January–June 
 January – Eli Whitney contracts with the U.S. federal government for 10,000 muskets, which he produces with interchangeable parts.
 January 4 – Constantine Hangerli enters Bucharest, as Prince of Wallachia.
 January 22 – A coup d'état is staged in the Netherlands (Batavian Republic). Unitarian Democrat Pieter Vreede  ends the power of the parliament (with a conservative-moderate majority).
 February 10 – The Pope is taken captive, and the Papacy is removed from power, by French General Louis-Alexandre Berthier.
 February 15 – U.S. Representative Roger Griswold (Fed-CT) beats Congressman Matthew Lyon (Dem-Rep-VT) with a cane after the House declines to censure Lyon earlier spitting in Griswold's face; the House declines to discipline either man.
 March – the Irish Rebellion of 1798 begins when the Irish Militia arrest the leadership of the Society of United Irishmen, a group unique amongst Irish republican and nationalist movements in that it unifies Catholics and Protestants (Anglican, Presbyterian, Methodist, Baptist and others) around republican ideals. This month, Lord Castlereagh is appointed Acting Chief Secretary for Ireland and on March 30 martial law is proclaimed here. The first battles in the rebellion are fought on May 24 and it continues through September, but the rebels receive much less than the expected support from France, which sends only 1,100 men.
 March 5 – French troops enter Bern.
 March 7 – French forces invade the Papal States and establish the Roman Republic.
 April 7 – The Mississippi Territory is organized by the United States, from territory ceded by Georgia and South Carolina; later it is twice expanded, to include disputed territory claimed by both the U.S. and Spain (which acquired territory in trade with Great Britain).
 April 12 – The Helvetic Republic, a French client republic, is proclaimed following the collapse of the Old Swiss Confederacy after the French invasion; Aarau becomes the republic's temporary capital.
 April 26 – France annexes Geneva.
 April 30 – The United States Department of the Navy is established as a cabinet-level department. Benjamin Stoddert, a civilian businessman, is appointed as the first Navy Secretary by President Adams.
 May 9 – Napoleon sets off for Toulon, sailing aboard Vice-Admiral Brueys's flagship L'Orient; his squadron is part of a larger fleet of over 300 vessels, carrying almost 37,000 troops.
 June 12 
 The French take Malta.
 A moderate coup d'état in the Netherlands (Batavian Republic) deposes Pieter Vreede.
 June 13 – Mission San Luis Rey de Francia is founded in California.
 June 18 – The first of the four Alien and Sedition Acts, the Naturalization Act of 1798, is signed into law by U.S. President Adams, requiring immigrants to wait 14 years rather than five years to become naturalized citizens of the United States. On June 25, another law is signed authorizing the imprisonment and deportation of any non-citizens deemed to be dangerous.

 July–December 
 July 1 – Egyptian Campaign: Napoleon disembarks his French army in Marabout Bay.
 July 7
 Quasi-War: The United States Congress rescinds treaties with France, sparking the war.
 In the action of USS Delaware vs La Croyable, the newly-formed United States Navy makes its first capture.
 July 11 – The United States Marine Corps is re-established under its present name.
 July 12 – Battle of Shubra Khit: French troops defeat the Mamelukes, during Napoleon's march from Alexandria to take Cairo.
 July 14 – The fourth of the Alien and Sedition Acts, the Sedition Act of 1798 is signed into law, making it a federal crime to write, publish, or utter false or malicious statements about the United States government.
 July 16 – The Relief of Sick and Disabled Seamen Act is signed into law, creating the Marine Hospital Service, the forerunner to the current United States Public Health Service Commissioned Corps.
 July 21 – Battle of the Pyramids: Napoleon defeats Ottoman forces near the Pyramids.
 July 24 – Napoleon occupies Cairo.
 July 31 – A second round of elections are held in the Netherlands (Batavian Republic); no general elections this time.
 August 1 – Battle of the Nile (near Abu Qir): Lord Nelson defeats the French navy under Admiral Brueys. 11 of the 13 French battleships are captured or destroyed, including the flagship Orient whose magazine explodes; Nelson himself is wounded in the head.
 August 22 – French troops land at Kilcummin in County Mayo to assist the Irish Rebellion.
 September – Charles Brockden Brown publishes the first significant American novel, the Gothic fiction Wieland: or, The Transformation; an American Tale.
 September 5 – Conscription is made mandatory in France by the Jourdan Law.
 September 10
 The Piedmontese Republic is declared in the territory of Piedmont.
 Battle of St. George's Caye: Off the coast of British Honduras (modern-day Belize), a group of European settlers and Africans defeat a Spanish force sent from Mexico to drive them out.
 September 18 – Lyrical Ballads is published anonymously by Samuel Taylor Coleridge and William Wordsworth, inaugurating the English Romantic movement in literature.
 September 23 – Battle of Killala: in the last land battle of the Irish Rebellion of 1798, British troops defeat the remaining rebel Irish and French forces at Killala.
 October 2 – The Cherokee nation signs a treaty with the United States allowing free passage through Cherokee lands in Tennessee through the Cumberland Gap through the Appalachian Mountains from Virginia into Kentucky.
 October 7 – U.S. Representative Matthew Lyon of Vermont becomes the first member of Congress to be put on trial for violating the new Sedition Act of 1798.
 October 12
 Battle of Tory Island: A British Royal Navy squadron, under Sir John Borlase Warren, prevents French Republican ships, commanded by Jean-Baptiste-François Bompart, from landing reinforcements for the Society of United Irishmen on the Donegal coast; Irish leader Wolfe Tone is captured and later dies of his wounds. This ends the Irish Rebellion of 1798.
 Peasants War against the French occupiers of the Southern Netherlands begins in Overmere.
 October 22 – Capitulation of the French garrison at Hyderabad to East India Company troops under James Kirkpatrick, British Resident.
 October 23 – The forces of Ali Pasha of Janina defeat the French and capture the town of Preveza in the Battle of Nicopolis.
 November 4 – The Russo-Ottoman siege of Corfu begins.
 November 8 – British whaler John Fearn becomes the first European to land on Nauru.
 November 28 – Trade between the United States and modern-day Uruguay begins when John Leamy's frigate John arrives in Montevideo.
 December 5 – Peasants War in the Southern Netherlands: The revolt is crushed in Hasselt; during the uprising it is estimated that 5,000 to 10,000 people have been killed.
 December 6 – General Joubert of the Piedmontese Republic occupies the Sardinian capital of Turin.

 Date unknown 
 Edward Jenner publishes An Inquiry into the Causes and Effects of the Variolæ Vaccinæ, describing the smallpox vaccine, in London.
 Thomas Malthus publishes An Essay on the Principle of Population (anonymously) in London.
 Nathan Mayer Rothschild moves from Frankfurt in the Holy Roman Empire to England, settling up in business as a textile trader and financier in Manchester.
 Alois Senefelder invents lithography.
 The first census in Brazil counts 2 million blacks in a total population of 3.25 million.
 The Ayrshire (Earl of Carrick's Own) Yeomanry, a British Army Yeomanry Cavalry Regiment, formed by The Earl of Cassillis at Culzean Castle, Ayrshire in 1794, is adopted onto the British Army List.
 The platypus is first discovered by Europeans.

Births 

 January 14 – Johan Rudolph Thorbecke, Dutch politician (d. 1872)
 January 19 – Auguste Comte, French sociologist (d. 1857)
 January 20 – Anson Jones, 5th and last President of the Republic of Texas (d. 1858)
 March 9 – Mathilda Berwald,  Finnish and Swedish concert singer (d. 1877)
 March 23 – Christiane Bøcher, Norwegian actress  (d. 1874)
 March 25 – Christoph Gudermann, German mathematician (d. 1852)
 March 25 – Corvo Attano, fictional character, Royal Protector, assassin (d. unknown)
 April 2 – August Heinrich Hoffmann von Fallersleben, German writer (d. 1874)
 April 3 – Charles Wilkes, American naval officer, explorer (d. 1877)
 April 12 – Baron du Potet, French writer (d. 1881)
 April 26 – Eugène Delacroix, French painter (d. 1863)
 April 28 – Duncan Forbes, British linguist (d. 1868)
 May 10 – Christodoulos Hatzipetros, Greek military leader (d. 1869)
 June 12 – William Abbot, English actor (d. 1843)
 June 14 – František Palacký, Czech historian, politician (d. 1876)
 June 29 – Giacomo Leopardi, Italian writer (d. 1837)
 July 14 – Alessandro Antonelli, Italian architect (d. 1888)
 July 15 – Alexander Gorchakov, Russian politician (d. 1883)
 August 17 – Thomas Hodgkin, British physician, pathologist (d. 1866)
 August 20 – Jacques Leroy de Saint-Arnaud, French general, Marshal of France, Minister of War (d. 1854)
 September 4 – Raynold Kaufgetz, Swiss academic (d. 1869)
 September 11 – Franz Ernst Neumann, German mineralogist, physicist and mathematician (d. 1895)
 October 2 – King Charles Albert of Sardinia (d. 1849)
 October 12 – Pedro I, Emperor of Brazil (also Pedro IV, King of Portugal) (d. 1834)
 December 2 – António Luís de Seabra, 1st Viscount of Seabra, Portuguese magistrate and politician (d. 1895)
 December 4 – Jules Armand Dufaure, 3-time prime minister of France (d. 1881)
 December 24 – Adam Mickiewicz, Polish writer (d. 1855)
 Date unknown: 
 Mary Faber, West African slave trader and local potentate (d. after 1857)
 Eduard von Feuchtersleben, Polish-born mining engineer and writer (d. 1857)

Deaths 

 January 3 – Carlo Aurelio Widmann, Venetian nobleman and admiral (b. 1750)
 January 22 – Lewis Morris, American landowner and developer, signer of the United States Declaration of Independence (b. 1726)
 February 12 – Stanisław August Poniatowski, deposed last King of Poland and Grand Duke of Lithuania (b. 1732)
 February 25 – Louis Jules Mancini Mazarini, French diplomat, writer (b. 1716)
 March 22 – Justin Morgan, American horse breeder and composer (b. 1747)
 March 25 – General Michel Joachim Marie Raymond, French leader of the army of the Nizam of Hyderabad (poisoned) (b. 1755) 
 April – Gideon Morris, trans-Appalachian pioneer (b. 1756)
 April 11 – Karl Wilhelm Ramler, German poet (b. 1725)
 April 12 – Madeleine de Puisieux, French writer, active feminist (b. 1720)
 April 14 – Henry Mowat, Scottish-born British Royal Navy officer (b. 1734)
 April 29 – Nikolaus Poda von Neuhaus, German entomologist (b. 1723)
 May 10 – George Vancouver, British Royal Navy officer, explorer (Vancouver, Canada is named after him) (b. 1757)
 May 19 – William Byron, 5th Baron Byron, English dueler (b. 1722)
 June – Betsy Gray, Irish rebel heroine
 June 4 – Giacomo Casanova, Italian adventurer, writer (b. 1725)
 June 21 – John Kelly of Killanne, Irish republican
 June 25 – Thomas Sandby, English cartographer, architect (b. 1721)
 June 29 – Catharina Mulder, Dutch organist (d. 1723) 
 July 17 – Henry Joy McCracken, Irish republican
 July 21 – François Sébastien Charles Joseph de Croix, Count of Clerfayt, Austrian field marshal (b. 1733)
 August 1 – François-Paul Brueys d'Aigalliers, French admiral (killed in battle) (b. 1753)
 August 11 – Joshua Clayton, American politician (b. 1744)
 August 18 – John Lewis Gervais, American revolutionary and politician (b. 1741)
 August 21 – James Wilson, American politician (b. 1742)
 August 24 – Thomas Alcock, English clergyman (b. 1709) 
 August 25 – Mikiel'Ang Grima, Maltese surgeon (b. 1731)
 September 21 – George Read, American lawyer, signer of the Declaration of Independence (b. 1733)
 November 5 – John Zephaniah Holwell, British surgeon (b. 1711)
 November 15 – Angelo Maria Amorevoli, Italian operatic tenor (b. 1716)
 November 19 – Wolfe Tone, Irish republican (b. 1737)
 November 21 – Gabriel Lenkiewicz, Belarusian Temporary Vicar General of the Society of Jesus (b. 1722)
 December 4 – Luigi Galvani, Italian physicist (b. 1737)
 December 16 – Thomas Pennant, Welsh naturalist (b. 1726)

References